Pol Braekman (22 November 1919 – 15 November 1994) was a Belgian sprinter. He competed in the men's 100 metres at the 1948 Summer Olympics.

References

1919 births
1994 deaths
Athletes (track and field) at the 1948 Summer Olympics
Belgian male sprinters
Olympic athletes of Belgium
Place of birth missing